In anatomy, a spatium or anatomic space is a space (cavity or gap). Anatomic spaces are often landmarks to find other important structures. When they fill with gases (such as air) or liquids (such as blood) in pathological ways, they can suffer conditions such as pneumothorax, edema, or pericardial effusion. Many anatomic spaces are potential spaces, which means that they are potential rather than realized (with their realization being dynamic according to physiologic or pathophysiologic events). In other words, they are like an empty plastic bag that has not been opened (two walls collapsed against each other; no interior volume until opened) or a balloon that has not been inflated.

Examples of anatomic spaces (or potential spaces) include:

Axillary space
Buccal space
Canine space
Cystohepatic triangle
Deep perineal space
Deep temporal space
Epidural space
Extraperitoneal space
Fascial spaces of the head and neck
Infratemporal space
Intercostal space
Intermembrane space
Interstitial spaces
Mental space
Pericardial space
Intraperitoneal space
Pleural space
Potential space
Pterygomandibular space
Quadrangular space
Retroperitoneal space
Retropharyngeal space
Retropubic space
Subarachnoid space
Subdural space
Sublingual space
Submandibular space
Submasseteric space
Traube's space

See also 
 Body cavity

Anatomy